Following the successful Austro-Turkish War of 1716–1718, and signing of peace, the Habsburgs established the Kingdom of Serbia (1718–1739) and appointed the first command cadre of the Serbian National Militia, composed out of two obor-kapetans, ten kapetans, two lieutenants and one major. The obor-kapetans were Vuk Isaković "Crnobarac" and Staniša Marković "Mlatišuma". The Military Governor notified the people that he had begun to organize the Militia in Serbia to set up outposts along the Habsburg–Ottoman border, and that he had been given the authorization to hurry up. The population gladly responded to the call, and quickly, beside the regular army under the two ober-kapetans and fifteen (unter-)kapetans, 13 companies of "hajduks" were collected, who were to be used for protection of the border and other services.

During the Austro-Russian–Turkish War (1735–1739), the Serbian National Militia was divided into 18 "hajduk" companies, distributed in four groups.

At the end of October 1737, when the war turned unfavourably for the Austrians, Serbian Militia men, 418 infantry ("hajduks") and 215 cavalry ("hussars"), crossed into Syrmia.

Operations
Attack on Užice (1737)
Attack on Lešnica
Liberation of Kruševac (20 July 1737), under the command of Mlatišuma
Retreat to Syrmia (End of October 1737), under the command of Isaković
Attacks in Morava and Rudnik (7 January 1739), under the command of Mlatišuma

Organization

Commanders
The militia was first organized after the establishment of the Kingdom of Serbia, then again during the 1735–1739 war. The commanders were listed in documents where they were all called "dangerous to the Turks".

Organization in ca. 1737–1739. The ten kapetans were distributed mainly in frontier areas.
obor-kapetans
Isaković
Mlatišuma
Kosta Dimitrijević (Paraćin)
Jovan Đurišić

kapetans
Trifun Isaković (Cvetke)
Aćim Prodanović (Osečenica)
Jevto Vitković (Valjevo)
Filip Obućina (Pranjani)
Keza Radivojević (Grocka)
Sima Vitković (Valjevo)
Nikola Čupić (Čačak)
Radivoj
Stojan Vuč
Josif Monasterlija (Posavina)
Vasa Nikolić (Podunavlje)

See also
Serbian Militia
Serbian Free Corps

References

Sources

Military history of Austria
Military history of Serbia
Military history of the Holy Roman Empire
18th century in Serbia
18th-century establishments in Serbia
Serbia under Habsburg rule
Cavalry units and formations
Infantry units and formations
Habsburg Serbs
Military units and formations of the Early Modern period
Military Frontier
1718 establishments in the Habsburg monarchy
Military units and formations established in 1718
Auxiliary military units
Army of the Habsburg monarchy